Alfred Bell was a member of the 81st New York State Legislature representing Livingston, New York in 1858.

References

19th-century American politicians
Year of birth missing
Year of death missing
Members of the New York State Assembly